The Film Academy Vienna (Filmakademie Wien) is the Institute for Film and Television at the University of Music and Performing Arts, Vienna.

Curriculum 

The offered programs (Bachelor/Master's degree) are:

Directing 
Screenwriting 
Cinematography 
Editing
Production

There is also a Digital Art - Compositing program (Master only).

During the first two years of study, students take classes in all programs, before they specialize in the field of study they applied for.

Application 

The application process takes place once a year: After completing given assignments, some of the applicants will be invited for one week of tests and interviews. The Filmacademy Vienna admits 15 to 20 new students per year.

Faculty 
The current faculty consists of internationally acclaimed filmmakers:

Michael Haneke and Wolfgang Murnberger in directing
Götz Spielmann, Sandra Bohle and Kathrin Resetarits in screenwriting
Wolfgang Thaler and Thomas Benesch in cinematography
Michael Hudecek in editing
Franz Brandstaetter in digital-art compositing
Danny Krausz in production

External links 

 Film Academy Vienna Website (german)
 International Filmfestival Filmacademy Vienna

Film schools in Austria
Education in Vienna